Peri Horne (born 21 April 1932) is a British figure skater. She competed in the pairs event at the 1952 Winter Olympics.

References

1932 births
Living people
British female pair skaters
Olympic figure skaters of Great Britain
Figure skaters at the 1952 Winter Olympics
Sportspeople from London